Urat may refer to:

 Urad, or cicilos a region in Bayannur, Inner Mongolia
 Urad Front Banner
 Urad Middle Banner
 Urad Rear Banner
Urat language, in Papua New Guinea